Elections for the Japanese House of Councillors were held in Japan in 1986.

Only half of this House of Councillors  was up for election. The results show the whole legislature following the elections.

Results

By constituency

References 

Japanese House of Councillors
House of Councillors (Japan) elections
House of Councillors election
Japanese House of Councillors election
Election and referendum articles with incomplete results